The angstrom is a unit of length equal to 0.1 nanometre, also spelled ångström (lower case).

Ångström or Angstrom may also refer to:

People
Anders Jonas Ångström (1814–1874), Swedish physicist
Anders Knutsson Ångström (1888–1981), Swedish physicist and meteorologist 
Lars Ångström, Swedish Green Party politician and member of the Riksdag 
Yvonne Ångström, Swedish Liberal People's Party politician

Other
42487 Ångström, main-belt asteroid
 Angstrom, a radio comedy series starring Matthew Holness
Angstrom (company), a variant spelling for the name of a group of Russian companies
Ångström (crater), lunar crater
Ångström distribution, Linux distribution for embedded devices
Angstrom exponent or Ångström exponent, an exponent used to describe the dependency of the aerosol optical thickness
Angstrom Levy, a comic-book supervillain in the Image Comics series Invincible
Angstrom Medica, a former name of Pioneer Surgical Technology
Rabbit Angstrom, character in John Updike's Rabbit series

See also
 Angstrom star, a unit of length equal to 1.000 014 98(90) angstrom
Angstrem (disambiguation), a Russian variant of transcription for Ångström (Angstrom)

Swedish-language surnames